The 2018–19 season was the 108th season in Hajduk Split's history and their twenty-eighth in the Prva HNL.

First-team squad
For details of former players, see List of HNK Hajduk Split players.

Competitions

Overall

Last updated: 26 May 2019.

HT Prva liga

Classification

Results summary

Results by round

Results by opponent

Source: 2018–19 Croatian First Football League article

Matches

Friendlies

Pre-season

On-season

Mid-season

HT Prva liga

Source:

Croatian Cup

Source: Croatian Football Federation

UEFA Europa League

Second qualifying round

Third qualifying round 

Source: uefa.com

Player seasonal records
Updated 27 February 2021

Goals

Source: Competitive matches

Clean sheets

Source: Competitive matches

Disciplinary record

Appearances and goals

Source: hajduk.hr

Overview of statistics

Transfers

In

Total spending:  850.000 €

Out

Total income:  15,200,000 €

Total expenditure:  14,000,000 €

Promoted from youth squad

Notes

References

2018-19
Croatian football clubs 2018–19 season
2018–19 UEFA Europa League participants seasons